Wainuia urnula is a species of air-breathing predatory land snail, a terrestrial pulmonate gastropod mollusc in the family Rhytididae.

Distribution and Description 
This species inhabits the North Island in New Zealand. Species is distinctively colorful with a large reddish patch in the umbilicus with the foot being of maroon color. Shells are relatively small when compared to sub fossil shells of the native island.

Feeding habits 
The diet of Wainuia urnula was found to contain amphipods (Parorchestia tenuis) in over 80% of snails sampled.

Life cycle 
Dimensions of a group of eggs of Wainuia urnula were: 5 × 4, 5 × 4, 5 × 4, 5 × 3.75, 4.5 × 3.5, 5.25 × 4.25 mm.

References

Rhytididae
Gastropods described in 1930